Chin Eei Hui (Hakka Pha̍k-fa-sṳ: Chhìn Ngì-fui; born 18 June 1982) is a former badminton player from Malaysia who plays in both women's and mixed doubles. She worked as a coach for Malaysia's national women's doubles players of which the contract ended in 2020. Starting from 2021 until now, she partners with Li-Ning and work with independent players such as Tan Kian Meng, Lai Pei Jing, Teo Ee Yi and Ong Yew Sin.

Career 
Chin Eei Hui and her former women's doubles partner, Wong Pei Tty have ranked as high as No. 1 worldwide. Together, Chin and Wong achieved much success by winning Superseries and Superseries Finals titles. They also clinched gold and bronze medals in 2010 and 2002 Commonwealth Games. Although not a regular mixed doubles player, Chin won a gold and a silver medal with different partners in 2002 and 2010 Commonwealth Games. Chin competed in badminton at the 2004 Summer Olympics in women's doubles with partner Wong Pei Tty. They defeated Seiko Yamada and Shizuka Yamamoto  of Japan in the first round but subsequently lost to Gao Ling and Huang Sui  of China in the round of 16. Although not well known  as a mixed doubles player, Chin created a first for Malaysia when she won the 2010 Commonwealth Games mixed doubles title, playing with Koo Kien Keat. She had also won a silver in the same event 8 years previously.

Achievements

World Cup 
Women's doubles

Commonwealth Games 
Women's doubles

Mixed doubles

Asian Championships 
Women's doubles

Southeast Asian Games 
Women's doubles

Mixed doubles

BWF Superseries 
The BWF Superseries, launched on 14 December 2006 and implemented in 2007, is a series of elite badminton tournaments, sanctioned by Badminton World Federation (BWF). BWF Superseries has two level such as Superseries and Superseries Premier. A season of Superseries features twelve tournaments around the world, which introduced since 2011, with successful players invited to the Superseries Finals held at the year end.

Women's doubles

  BWF Superseries Finals tournament
  BWF Superseries Premier tournament
  BWF Superseries tournament

BWF Grand Prix 
The BWF Grand Prix had two levels, the BWF Grand Prix and Grand Prix Gold. It was a series of badminton tournaments sanctioned by the Badminton World Federation (BWF) which was held from 2007 to 2017. The World Badminton Grand Prix sanctioned by International Badminton Federation (IBF) from 1983 to 2006.

Women's doubles

  BWF Grand Prix Gold tournament
  IBF & BWF Grand Prix tournament

BWF International Challenge/Series 
Women's doubles

  BWF International Challenge tournament
  BWF International Series tournament

References

External links 
 Profile at Badminton Association of Malaysia
 
 
 
 

1982 births
Living people
People from Penang
Malaysian sportspeople of Chinese descent
Malaysian female badminton players
Badminton players at the 2004 Summer Olympics
Badminton players at the 2008 Summer Olympics
Olympic badminton players of Malaysia
Badminton players at the 2002 Commonwealth Games
Badminton players at the 2006 Commonwealth Games
Badminton players at the 2010 Commonwealth Games
Commonwealth Games gold medallists for Malaysia
Commonwealth Games silver medallists for Malaysia
Commonwealth Games bronze medallists for Malaysia
Commonwealth Games medallists in badminton
Badminton players at the 2002 Asian Games
Badminton players at the 2006 Asian Games
Asian Games competitors for Malaysia
Competitors at the 2001 Southeast Asian Games
Competitors at the 2003 Southeast Asian Games
Competitors at the 2005 Southeast Asian Games
Competitors at the 2007 Southeast Asian Games
Competitors at the 2009 Southeast Asian Games
Southeast Asian Games gold medalists for Malaysia
Southeast Asian Games bronze medalists for Malaysia
Southeast Asian Games medalists in badminton
World No. 1 badminton players
Badminton coaches
Medallists at the 2002 Commonwealth Games
Medallists at the 2006 Commonwealth Games
Medallists at the 2010 Commonwealth Games